Gunder is both a given name and a surname. Notable people with the name include:

Given name:
Andre Gunder Frank (1929–2005), German-American economic historian and sociologist
Gunder Anton Johannesen Jahren (1858–1933), the Norwegian Minister of Agriculture 1920–1921
Gunder Bengtsson (born 1946), former Swedish association football coach
Gunder Gundersen (1930–2005), Norwegian Nordic combined skier and sports official
Gunder Hägg (1918–2004), Swedish runner and multiple world record breaker of the 1940s
Gunder Olson (1852–1948), North Dakota public servant and politician with the Republican Party

Surname:
Jeane Daniel Gunder (1888–1948), American entomologist who specialised in butterflies
Michael Gunder, Senior planning lecturer in the School of Architecture and Planning at the University of Auckland